Ehad Mi Yodea is a traditional cumulative song sung on Passover and found in the haggadah.  It enumerates common Jewish motifs and teachings. It is meant to be fun and humorous, while still imparting important lessons to the children present.

Recitation varies from family to family. The song has versions in Hebrew, Yiddish, Arabic, and many other vernacular languages. Sometimes it is played as a memory game, recited without looking. Sometimes the goal is to recite the entire verse in one breath.

Names

Meaning
Although it can appear to be simply a juvenile children's song, an important message is being imparted to those present at the Passover table. The main theme of Passover, and particularly of the Seder, is not only the physical freedom of a nation of slaves. More importantly, it is the spiritual and mental freeing of this people, to become a nation unto God, His Chosen People. As His people, the Jewish Nation is expected to be wholly at one with God, and to relate everything in their lives to Him.
It is sometimes thought that word association reveals the unconscious mind. Thus, it is at this point in the Seder that the Jews sing this cumulative song. After relating God's wonders and kindness, and the events of the Exodus, the song demonstrates how everything can and should relate to God: "If I say 'One', you think 'God!', if I say 'Five', you think 'Books of Moses!'"

History
According to the Encyclopaedia Judaica, this song is first found in Ashkenazi Haggadot of the 16th century. It is believed to have originated in Germany in the 15th century, possibly based on a German folk song "Guter freund ich frage dich", which means "Good friend, I ask you".

Structure and text
"Echad Mi Yodea" is a cumulative song, meaning that each verse is built on top of the previous verses. There are thirteen verses.

The first verse runs:

Who knows one?
I know one.
One is our God, in heaven and on earth.

The second verse:

Who knows two?
I know two.
Two are the tablets of the covenant;
One is our God, in heaven and on earth.

...and so forth. The last verse is:

Who knows thirteen?
I know thirteen.
Thirteen are God's principles;
Twelve are the tribes of Israel;
Eleven are the stars of Joseph's dream;
Ten are the Commandments;
Nine are the months of childbirth;
Eight are the days before circumcision;
Seven are the days of the week;
Six are the sections of the Mishnah;
Five are the books of the Torah;
Four are the Matriarchs;
Three are the Patriarchs;
Two are the tablets of the covenant;
One is our God, in heaven and on earth.

Yiddish version

Spanish version
Showing the last complete paragraph, as an example. 
First and Last verses would be sung in Hebrew.
 Shloshá Asar, Mi Yodea?
 Shloshá Asar, Ani Yodea!

 Trece años del Bar Mitzvá
 Doce Tribus de Israel
 Once Estrellas de Iaakov
 Diez Mandamientos Son
 Nueve Meses de la preñada
 Ocho Días del Milá
 Siete Días de la Semana
 Seis Libros de la Mishná
 Cinco Libros de la Torá
 Cuatro Madres de Israel
 Tres Nuestros Padres Son
 Dos Tablas de La Ley
 Uno es el Creador
 
 Eloheinu, Eloheinu, 
 Eloheinu, Eloheinu,
 She-bashamaim uva'aretz

Judaeo-Ladino version
 Ken supyese y entendyese alavar al Dio kreyense?

 Kuale es el uno? 
 Uno es el Kriador, Baruch Hu Baruch shemo

 Kuales son loz dos? 
 Dos Moshe y Aron

 Kuales son los tres? 
 Trez padrez muestros son, [Avram, Itzhak, y Yaakov]

 Kuales son los kuatro? 
 Kuatro madrez muestras son, [Sara, Rivka, Leah, Rahel]

 Kuales son los sinko? 
 Sinko livroz de la Ley

 Kuales son los seish? 
 Seish diaz de la semana

 Kuales son los syete? 
 Syete dias con Shabbat

 Kuales son loz ocho? 
 Ocho diaz de la mila 

 Kuales son loz nueve? 
 Nueve mezes de la prenyada

 Kuales son los diesh? 
 Diez mandamientoz de la Ley

 Kuales son loz onze? 
 Onze trivoz in Yisrael

 Kuales son loz doze? 
 Dosay trivos kon Yosef

Judaeo-Arabic version
According to the custom of Aram Soba, Aleppo:
מן יִעלַם וּמן יִדרִי
ללַה רַבּ אִל מִדגַ'ללִי

הֵדַה הִנֵּן אִל תלַתַּעִשׁ

תלַתַּעִשׁ לֵבֵס תֵפִילִין‫  
 תנַעִשׁ שׁבטֵי יִשְׂרָאֵל
חדַעִשׁ כּוֹכַּב בִּשַּׂמַה
 עַשִׁר קִלְמַת אִתּוֹרָה
 תִּשׁעַת אִשׁהוֹר אִל חִבּלֵה
 תִמִן-ת-אִיַּים אִל מִילָה
 שַׂבעת-אִיַּים אִל חוּפָּה
 סִתֵּי סְדַאדִיר אִל מִשׁנָה
 כַמשֵׂה מְסַאחַף אִתּוֹרָה
אַרבַּעַה אִמַּתנַה
וּתלַתֵה אַבַּתנַה
וּתנֵן מוּסַה וּאַהַרן
וַאחַד יאַלִי-כַלַאְנַה
אַללַהוּ אַללַהוּ לַא אִלַהּ אִללַה הוּא
 וַאחִִיד 

Transliteration
 Min ya'elam wumin yidri
 Allah rab el mijalli
 Hinen il tleta'ash
 tleta'ash Libs Tfilin
 tna'ash shibte Yisrael
 hda'ash kokab bisama
 'asher qilmat itorah
 tisa'at ishhor il hible
 tmint-iyyam il mila
 sab'at-iyyam il hupa
 site sdadir il Mishna
 khamse msahaf itorah.
 Arba'a imatna
 wutlate abatna
 wutnen Musa waAharon
 wahid rabi ilkhalana,
 Allah hu wahid

Translation
 Who knows, and who understands?
 God is the master of the revealed universe
 God is the one and the only Creator.
 God, God, there is no God but God.
 (some say: Blessed be He and Blessed be His Name)
 (some say: God is one)
 Thirteen is tefillin
 twelve tribes of Israel
 eleven stars in the sky
 ten commandments
 nine months of pregnancy
 eight days for circumcision
 seven days for huppa
 six orders of the Mishna
 five books of the Torah
 four mothers
 three fathers
 two are Moses and Aaron
 God is the one and the only Creator.
 God, God, there is no God but God.

Judaeo-Tajik or Bokharian version
Yakumin kie medonad? Yakumin man’ medonam! Yakumin: Khudoyi rabul olamin.

Duyumin kie medonad? Duyumin man’ medonam! Duyumin: du’u lavhie gavhar. Yakumin: Khudoyi rabul olamin.

Seyumin kie medonad? Seyumin man’ medonam! Seyumin: se’e padaron. Duyumin: du’u lavhie gavhar. Yakumin: Khudoyi rabul olamin.

Chorumin kie medonad? Chorumin man’ medonam! Chorumin: chor’ modaron. Seyumin: se’e padaron. Duyumin: du’u lavhie gavhar. Yakumin: Khudoyi rabul olamin.

Panjumin kie medonad? Panjumin man’ medonam! Panjumin: panj sifrey Toro. Chorumin: chor’ modaron. Seyumin: se’e padaron. Duyumin: du’u lavhie gavhar. Yakumin: Khudoyi rabul olamin.

Shashtumin kie medonad? Shashtumin man’ medonam! Shishtumin: shash sidrey mishno. Panjumin: panj sifrey Toro. Chorumin: chor’ modaron. Seyumin: se’e padaron. Duyumin: du’u lavhie gavhar. Yakumin: Khudoyi rabul olamin.

Haftumin kie medonad? Haftumin man’ medonam! Haftumin: haft rouzi hafta. Shishtumin: shash sidrey mishno. Panjumin: panj sifrey Toro. Chorumin: chor’ modaron. Seyumin: se’e padaron. Duyumin: du’u lavhie gavhar. Yakumin: Khudoyi rabul olamin.

Hashtumin kie medonad? Hashtumin man’ medonam! Hashtumin: hasht rouzi millo. Haftumin: haft rouzi hafta. Shishtumin: shash sidrey mishno. Panjumin: panj sifrey Toro. Chorumin: chor’ modaron. Seyumin: se’e padaron. Duyumin: du’u lavhie gavhar. Yakumin: Khudoyi rabul olamin.

Nohumin kie medonad? Nohumin man’ medonam! Nohumin: noh mohie zanon. Hashtumin: hasht rouzi millo. Haftumin: haft rouzi hafta. Shishtumin: shash sidrey mishno. Panjumin: panj sifrey Toro. Chorumin: chor’ modaron. Seyumin: se’e padaron. Duyumin: du’u lavhie gavhar. Yakumin: Khudoyi rabul olamin.

Dahumin kie medonad? Dahumin man’ medonam! Dahumin: dah sukhanon. Nohumin: noh mohie zanon. Hashtumin: hasht rouzi millo. Haftumin: haft rouzi hafta. Shishtumin: shash sidrey mishno. Panjumin: panj sifrey Toro. Chorumin: chor’ modaron. Seyumin: se’e padaron. Duyumin: du’u lavhie gavhar. Yakumin: Khudoyi rabul olamin.

Yozdahum kie medonad? Yozdahum man’ medonam! Yozdahum: yozdah sitoraho. Dahumin: dah sukhanon. Nohumin: noh mohie zanon. Hashtumin: hasht rouzi millo. Haftumin: haft rouzi hafta. Shishtumin: shash sidrey mishno. Panjumin: panj sifrey Toro. Chorumin: chor’ modaron. Seyumin: se’e padaron. Duyumin: du’u lavhie gavhar. Yakumin: Khudoyi rabul olamin.

Duvozdahum kie medonad? Duvozdahum man medonam! Duvozdahum: duvozdah shivtoho. Yozdahum: yozdah sitoraho. Dahumin: dah sukhanon. Nohumin: noh mohie zanon. Hashtumin: hasht rouzi millo. Haftumin: haft rouzi hafta. Shishtumin: shash sidrey mishno. Panjumin: panj sifrey Toro. Chorumin: chor’ modaron. Seyumin: se’e padaron. Duyumin: du’u lavhie gavhar. Yakumin: Khudoyi rabul olamin.

Sezdahum kie medonad? Sezdahum man’ medonam! Sezdahum: sezdah khislatho. Duvozdahum: duvozdah shivtoho. Yozdahum: yozdah sitoraho. Dahumin: dah sukhanon. Nohumin: noh mohie zanon. Hashtumin: hasht rouzi millo. Haftumin: haft rouzi hafta. Shishtumin: shash sidrey mishno. Panjumin: panj sifrey Toro. Chorumin: chor’ modaron. Seyumin: se’e padaron. Duyumin: du’u lavhie gavhar. Yakumin: Khudoyi rabul olamin.

Popular culture
The song appears in The Garden of the Finzi-Continis (film) 1970 movie, sung amidst the rise of Mussolini's racial laws and alignment with Nazi Germany.

The Judaism section of the Stack Exchange Network of question-and-answer websites is named Mi Yodeya after this song.

Entebbe (titled 7 Days in Entebbe in the U.S.), a 2018 crime thriller film directed by José Padilha and written by Gregory Burke, features a dance on the tunes of the Echad Mi Yodea song, choreographed by Ohad Naharin of the Batsheva dance company.

During an episode of the interactive cartoon "Charlie Gets Fired", the user has the chance for Charlie to sing the whole song. This much chagrin to his boss.

See also
Green Grow the Rushes, O

References

External links
 Listen to Echad Mi Yodea online
 Listen & watch Echad Mi Yodea video with Hebrew lyrics and English translation

Passover songs
Hebrew-language songs
Cumulative songs
Haggadah of Pesach
Hebrew words and phrases in Jewish prayers and blessings